Montodine is a comune (municipality) in the Province of Cremona in the Italian region Lombardy, located about  southeast of Milan and about  northwest of Cremona.  

Montodine borders the following municipalities: Bertonico, Moscazzano, Ripalta Arpina, Ripalta Guerina.

References

Cities and towns in Lombardy